The Salon des Réalités Nouvelles is an association of artists and an art exhibition in Paris, focusing on abstract art.

A first exhibition with the name was held in 1939 in Galerie Charpentier, organised by Robert Delaunay, Sonia Delaunay, Nelly van Doesburg and Fredo Sidès.

In 1946 the Salon was officially established as a successor to Abstraction-Création by Fredo Sidès, and its first board included Jean Arp, Sonia Delaunay and Albert Gleizes as members. Sidès was chairman until his death in 1953.

Over the years the exhibition has been held at several locations. From 2004 to 2020 it has been held at the Parc Floral de Paris in Vincennes, showing paintings, sculpture and photography by over 350 artists each year.

Notes and references

Sources

External links
 Salon des Réalités Nouvelles

Modern art
Art exhibitions in France
20th century in France